Husinec may refer to places:

Husinec (Prachatice District), a town in the South Bohemian Region of the Czech Republic
Husinec (Prague-East District), a municipality and village in the Central Bohemian Region of the Czech Republic
Husinec, a village in Hrašćina Municipality in Croatia
Husinec, old name of Gęsiniec, a village in Lower Silesia, Poland